= Murder in Rhode Island law =

Murder in Rhode Island law constitutes the intentional killing, under circumstances defined by law, of people within or under the jurisdiction of the U.S. state of Rhode Island.

The United States Centers for Disease Control and Prevention reported that in the year 2020, the state had one of the lowest murder rates in the country.

== Definitions ==
Rhode Island law defined murder as "the unlawful killing of a human being with malice aforethought", with first degree murder including "every murder perpetrated by poison, lying in wait, or any other kind of willful, deliberate, malicious, and premeditated killing", as well as murders committed in the course of a lengthy list of other crimes, or against various public officers in the performance of their duties. All other murders are classified as second degree murders.

== Penalties ==
Offense	Mandatory sentence
Second degree murder	Minimum of 10 years (eligible for parole after serving half the sentence) and maximum of life (minimum of 25 years)
First degree murder	Life without parole or life (minimum of 25 years)
